The 5% Album is the debut solo album by American rapper Lord Jamar, best known as a member of the group Brand Nubian.

Background
The album's title and subject matter are taken from the Nation of Gods and Earths teachings that only five percent of the population is enlightened, good, and willing to help those who are oppressed. It features guest appearances by Wu-Tang Clan members RZA and Raekwon, fellow Brand Nubian members Grand Puba and Sadat X, Wu-Tang affiliate Popa Wu, and the sons of GZA (Young Justice), Ol' Dirty Bastard (Young Dirty Bastard), and Jamar (Young Lord). The album peaked at number 94 on the Top R&B/Hip-Hop Albums chart.

Track listing
All songs produced by Lord Jamar

Charts

Personnel 
Credits for The 5% Album adapted from AllMusic.
 J. Glenn – composer
 Lord Jamar – audio production
 Prodigal Sunn – performer
 Michael Sarsfield – mastering
 Chuck Wilson – audio production, concept, executive producer
 C. Woods – composer
 Big Throwback - producer

References

External links 
 
 

2006 debut albums
Babygrande Records albums
Five-Percent Nation
Lord Jamar albums